This is a list of members of the Victorian Legislative Council between 1985 and 1988. As half of the Legislative Council's terms expired at each periodic election, half of these members were elected at the 1982 state election with terms expiring in 1988, while the other half were elected at the 1985 state election with terms expiring in 1992.

Until the passage of the Constitution (Duration of Parliament) Act 1984 (No. 10106), one of several reforms enacted by the Cain Labor government, elections for the Legislative Assembly were termed the "triennial elections", but they were renamed "periodic elections" with the duration of Parliaments after 1988 being extended to four years.

A redistribution in 1984 took effect from the 1985 election.

 The result in Nunawading Province was extremely close at the 1985 election, and Labor candidate Bob Ives was initially declared the victor. The result was overturned by the Court of Disputed Returns before he could take his seat, and Liberal candidate Rosemary Varty won the resulting by-election in August 1985.
 In February 1987, Central Highlands Liberal MLC Fred Grimwade resigned. Liberal candidate Marie Tehan won the resulting by-election in April.
 Geelong MLC Rod Mackenzie was elected as a representative of the Labor Party, but resigned from the party on 14 December 1987. He served out the remainder of his term as an independent.

Sources
 Re-member (a database of all Victorian MPs since 1851). Parliament of Victoria.

Members of the Parliament of Victoria by term
20th-century Australian politicians